The Braunes Bergschaf is a breed of domestic sheep from the Tyrol area of Austria and Italy. It derives from cross-breeding of the Tiroler Steinschaf of the Tyrol with the Italian Bergamasca and Padovana breeds. It is raised in the Austrian states of Lower Austria, Salzburg, Styria and Tyrol; in the Vinschgau, Ultental, Passeiertal and Schnalstal in the autonomous province of Bolzano in Italy; in the Swiss Engadine; and in  Baden-Württemberg, Bavaria, Lower Saxony and Mecklenburg-Vorpommern in Germany.

In Italy the Braunes Bergschaf is known as the "Schwarzbraunes Bergschaf", while the Swiss Schwarzbraunes Bergschaf is in Italy called Juraschaf. It is one of the forty-two autochthonous local sheep breeds of limited distribution for which a herdbook is kept by the Associazione Nazionale della Pastorizia, the Italian national association of sheep-breeders; 

Numbers were reported to be 3698 to 5000 in Austria in 2012, 1564 in Germany in 2011 and 2850 in Italy in 2008.

References

Sheep breeds originating in Austria
Animal breeds on the GEH Red List